The Little Chilliwack River is a small river in Whatcom County, Washington.  It is a tributary of the Chilliwack River, entering the river just below the Canada–United States border.

Course
The river originates at a ridge between it and Silesia Creek.  It flows just over 7 miles northeast from there to its confluence with the Chilliwack on the opposite side of the river from a trail leading up the Chilliwack.  The Little Fork merges with it just under 2 km above its mouth.

Little Fork
The Little Fork Little Chilliwack River starts at the base of Copper Mountain.  It flows about 4 ½ km northeast as well, merging with the main fork about 2 km upstream from the river's mouth.

See also
List of tributaries of the Fraser River
List of rivers in Washington

External links

Rivers of Washington (state)
Rivers of Whatcom County, Washington